Hips, Hips, Hooray! is a 1934 American Pre-Code slapstick comedy starring Bert Wheeler, Robert Woolsey, Ruth Etting, Thelma Todd, and Dorothy Lee. During its initial theatrical run, it was preceded by the two-color Technicolor short Not Tonight, Josephine, directed by Edward F. Cline.

Plot
Todd stars as Amelia Frisby, the owner of a beauty supply business. Andy Williams (Wheeler) and Dr. Bob Dudley (Woolsey) convince her to hire them as salesman to promote her new flavored lipstick. The film features Etting singing "Keep Romance Alive" and Bert Wheeler and Dorothy Lee singing "Keep on Doin' What You're Doin'" by Bert Kalmar and Harry Ruby.

Cast
 Bert Wheeler as Andy Williams
 Robert Woolsey as Dr. Bob Dudley
 Dorothy Lee as Daisy Maxwell
 Thelma Todd as Amelia Frisby
 Ruth Etting as herself
 Phyllis Barry as Madame Irene
 Matt Briggs as Det. Epstein
 James P. Burtis as Detective Sweeney
 Spencer Charters as Clark
 George Meeker as Armand Beauchamp
 Doris McMahon as maid
 Thelma White as Blonde (uncredited)

Pre-Code era scenes
Hips, Hips, Hooray! showed scantily clad burlesque-style showgirls and female extras as typical of the Hollywood musicals in the Pre-Code era. Doris McMahon portrayed a nearly nude maid who wore only an apron.

Production
The song "Keep on Doin' What You're Doin'" was intended for the Marx Brothers' 1933 film Duck Soup (Groucho Marx, Harpo Marx, Chico Marx and Zeppo Marx in his final starring role).

A romantic subplot involving Ruth Etting was planned, but removed from the film. Despite being third-billed, Etting only has one scene.

Reception
The film made a profit of $8,000.

The New York Times gave Hips, Hips, Hooray! an unenthusiastic review, stating that it featured "three reasonably hilarious gags and perhaps fifty more that depend on whether you are for or against the ex-vaudeville clowns to begin with." Alternately, the Prescott Evening Courier described it as "smartly and enthusiastically insane...surpassing all [Wheeler and Woolsey's] previous efforts." An Australian reviewer for The Age, felt that it "proved a fairly generously-endowed medley of eccentric dancing, buffoonery and burlesque" and that it provoked "much merriment" from its audience.

References

External links
 
 
 
 
 

1934 films
1934 musical comedy films
1934 romantic comedy films
American musical comedy films
American romantic comedy films
American romantic musical films
American black-and-white films
1930s English-language films
Films directed by Mark Sandrich
RKO Pictures films
1930s American films